Myrio or MyRIO may refer to:

 MyRIO, an embedded processor board from National Semiconductor
 Myria-